Hawes Spencer is the founder and editor of The Hook, the weekly newspaper in Charlottesville, Virginia and the Shenandoah Valley. He is also a founder of Charlottesville's other alternative newsweekly C-ville Weekly and owned and operated Charlottesville's Jefferson Theater from 1992 to 2006.

Career
Spencer covered Charlottesville news for 23 years. He founded The Hook on February 7, 2002, with Bill Chapman and Rob Jiranek. Here he worked as the editor-in-chief. He is the author of Summer of Hate, a book about the violence surrounding Unite the Right rally, the white nationalist rally in Charlottesville in August, 2017.

References

Sources and external links
 The Hook
 The Jefferson Theater
 Cavalier Daily article on first weeks of the Hook
 Summer of Hate: Charlottesville, USA

American male journalists
Living people
Year of birth missing (living people)
Writers from Charlottesville, Virginia
Journalists from Virginia
21st-century American writers